“Dostlug” Order – translated as the Order of Friendship, is the order of Azerbaijan Republic. The order is ratified by Ilham Aliyev-the President of Azerbaijan Republic on 16 February 2007 by the Decree No. 248-IIIQ.

Status
The “Dostlug” Order of Azerbaijan Republic is given to the citizens of Republic of Azerbaijan, foreign nationals and non-citizens for the following services:
special contribution to development of friendly, economical and cultural relations between Azerbaijan and a foreign state;
special contribution to strengthening of international friendship;
special contribution to building of constructive relations among civilizations and carrying on a dialog among cultures;
special contributions to establishment of peace and stability among countries, regions and in the whole world.

The order is pinned to the left side of the chest. If there are any other orders and medals of Azerbaijan Republic is followed by them, and follows Heydar Aliyev Order, Istiglal Order, Shah Ismail Order, Azerbaijani Flag Order, Shohrat Order, Sheref Order up to the “For service to the Fatherland” Order.

Elements
The order is made of gold and represents an eight-pointed star with sharp ends. A golden relief with the image of bird’s wings is mounted to the plate. A picture of the Earth made of lustrous platinum is depicted between the wings of the bird made of dark-yellow colored gold. The order is decorated with ribbon in the colors of the National Flag of Azerbaijan. The rear side of the order is polished and has an engraved order number in the center. The order set includes:

for hanging around the neck: the ribbon in the colors of the National Flag of Azerbaijan (width 23 mm) and the order (50 mm x 50 mm).
for pinning to the chest: the ribbon in the colors of the National Flag of Azerbaijan (21 mm x 50 mm) and the order (35 mm x 35 mm).
element for pinning to the chest: plate colored with the colors of the National Flag of Azerbaijan (1 mm x 15 mm).

Recipients
 Ruslan Aushev
 Alexander Dzasokhov
 Murad Kajlayev
 Joseph Kobzon
 Krzysztof Krajewski
 Nikita Mikhalkov
 Sergey Naryshkin
 Alla Pugacheva
 Gianfranco Ravasi
 Roald Sagdeev
 Mikhail Shvydkoy
 Leonid Slutsky (politician)
 Vitali Smirnov
 Olzhas Suleimenov
 Aman Tuleyev
 Mahmoud Vaezi
 Vaira Vīķe-Freiberga
 Vladimir Yakunin
 Alexander Zhilkin
Alexander (Ishein), Archbishop of Baku and Azerbaijan from 1999 to 2021
Reza Deghati
 Irina Vlah
 Baghdad Amreyev

References

Orders, decorations, and medals of Azerbaijan
2007 establishments in Azerbaijan
Awards established in 2007